Shree Harikul Model Higher Secondary School also called Shree Harikul in short  is a privately owned secondary school in Kankai Municipality, Surunga, Jhapa District, Nepal, established in 1995. It is one of the oldest school in the locality which has been running through private sector and in English medium.

History
The school was founded by Chandra Prasad Mainali following his retirement from Government school Shree Kankai Secondary School, Surunga. The name of the school is derived from the names of Mainali's parents: Mother Harimaya and Father Kulprasad.

Staff, Students and Facilities

Shree Harikul has classes from Nursery to Grade 12. It has a faculty of Humanities and Management at the college level. As of 2020 there are about 1200 students. There are six school vehicles that carry students from different places. Shree Harikul also gives scholarship to some students every year. The school has 60 members of staff including teachers, drivers and other workers. There are qualified teachers with at least one years experience. Shree Harikul provides several educational related facilities to students. It is an English-medium school in Nepal where teaching is done in English.

Events

Shree Harikul hosts an annual function with different events celebrating the school's anniversary on 6 February (23 Magh) each year. It also takes parts in different cultural events organized by PABSON (an association of Nepalese Private Schools). Shree Harikul has won different prizes which can be found in several online magazines.
It also performs a School Programmes on every  Friday which is called as Friday-Programme.

See also
List of schools in Nepal

External links

References

Boarding schools in Nepal
Educational institutions established in 1995
1995 establishments in Nepal